Heikki Aalto (born 12 March 1961) is a Finnish former professional ice hockey forward.

Aalto played 37 games over two seasons for Kärpät of the SM-liiga between 1981 and 1983, scoring one goal. He also played in the 1. Divisioona for Ketterä and JoKP.

References

External links

1961 births
Living people
Finnish ice hockey forwards
Imatran Ketterä players
Jokipojat players
Oulun Kärpät players
Sportspeople from Oulu